Dmitry Aleksandrovich Begun (born 23 April 2003) is a Russian football player. He plays for FC Dynamo Moscow.

Club career
He made his debut for FC Dynamo Moscow on 31 August 2022 in a Russian Cup game against FC Rostov.

Career statistics

References

External links
 
 
 
 

200 births
Sportspeople from Vladivostok
Living people
Russian footballers
Association football midfielders
FC Dynamo Moscow players
Russian Second League players